In mathematics, Nemytskii operators are a class of nonlinear operators on Lp spaces with good continuity and boundedness properties. They take their name from the mathematician Viktor Vladimirovich Nemytskii.

Definition

Let Ω be a domain (an open and connected set) in n-dimensional Euclidean space. A function f : Ω × Rm → R is said to satisfy the Carathéodory conditions if
 f(x, u) is a continuous function of u for almost all x ∈ Ω;
 f(x, u) is a measurable function of x for all u ∈ Rm.

Given a function f satisfying the Carathéodory conditions and a function u : Ω → Rm, define a new function F(u) : Ω → R by

The function F is called a Nemytskii operator.

Boundedness theorem

Let Ω be a domain, let 1 < p < +∞ and let g ∈ Lq(Ω; R), with

Suppose that f satisfies the Carathéodory conditions and that, for some constant C and all x and u,

Then the Nemytskii operator F as defined above is a bounded and continuous map from Lp(Ω; Rm) into Lq(Ω; R).

References

  (Section 10.3.4)

Operator theory